Santa Rosa Beach is an unincorporated community in Walton County, Florida, United States. It is part of the Fort Walton Beach-Crestview-Destin, Florida Metropolitan Statistical Area.

Geography

Santa Rosa Beach, FL is located at 30.3960324°, -86.2288322°. It is located north of U.S. Route 98 on the shores of Hogtown Bayou of the Choctawhatchee Bay. U.S. Route 98 leads east 18 mi (29 km) to Rosemary Beach and west 10 mi (16 km) to Miramar Beach. 

The town was originally known as Hogtown until the later part of the 18th Century.

Although unincorporated, the area is assigned a specific ZIP code, 32459, which also includes the communities of Point Washington to the East and a 15-mile stretch of the Emerald Coast from the east side of Miramar Beach to the west side of Seagrove Beach and the beach communities along 30A, including Grayton Beach and Seaside.

Overall, this zip code covers a land area of 65 square miles (plus 0.82 square miles of water area) for a population of 11,457 (4,831 households) according to the 2010 census.

See also
Deer Lake State Park
Grayton Beach State Park
Point Washington State Forest
Topsail Hill Preserve State Park

References

Unincorporated communities in Walton County, Florida
Unincorporated communities in Florida
Populated coastal places in Florida on the Gulf of Mexico